Xavier Gibson (born November 3, 1988) is an American professional basketball player for Osaka Evessa in Japan. His nickname is X.

Career statistics 

|-
| align="left" |  2013–14
| align="left" | Shinshu
| 52 || || 28.3 || .509 || .361 || .704 || 10.2 || 2.3 || 1.3 || 2.1 ||  17.2 
|-
| align="left" | 2014–15
| align="left" | Toyota
| 54 ||35 ||20.1 ||.520  ||.333  ||.798  ||6.5  || 0.6 || 0.6 || 1.9 || 13.2
|-
| align="left" |  2015–16
| align="left" | Shinshu
| 42 ||42 ||32.2 || .480 ||.338  ||.765  ||10.1  || 2.5 ||1.3  ||bgcolor="CFECEC"|2.5*  ||  22.1
|-
| align="left" |  2016–17
| align="left" | Osaka
| 58 ||39 ||23.8 || .488 ||.292  ||.714  ||6.5  || 1.3 ||0.9  ||0.9  ||  15.4
|-
| align="left" |  2017–18
| align="left" | Osaka
| 28 ||25 ||25.6 || .497 ||.213  ||.753  ||8.4  || 2.7 ||1.2 ||0.6  ||  17.0
|-
| align="left" |  2018–19
| align="left" | Osaka
| 29 ||24 ||27.1 || .452 ||.353  ||.642  ||7.0  || 2.4 ||1.0 ||1.0  ||  14.4
|-

References

External links
Florida State Seminoles bio

1988 births
Living people
Alvark Tokyo players
American expatriate basketball people in Greece
American expatriate basketball people in Japan
American expatriate basketball people in Turkey
American men's basketball players
Antalya Büyükşehir Belediyesi players
Basketball players from Alabama
Florida State Seminoles men's basketball players
Lakeland Magic players
Niigata Albirex BB players
Osaka Evessa players
Panelefsiniakos B.C. players
Shinshu Brave Warriors players
Sportspeople from Dothan, Alabama
Centers (basketball)
Power forwards (basketball)